Luigi Tenco (21 March 1938 – 27 January 1967) was an Italian singer-songwriter.

Biography
Tenco was born in Cassine (province of Alessandria) in 1938, the son of Teresa Zoccola and Giuseppe Tenco. He never knew his father, who died in unclear circumstances. It has been rumored that Luigi Tenco was the fruit of the extramarital relationship of his mother and the sixteen-year-old son of the wealthy family for whom she worked at the time. He has been described as "a sort of Italian Charles Aznavour".

Tenco spent his childhood in Cassine and Ricaldone until 1948, when he moved to Liguria, first to Nervi and then to Genoa, where his mother had a wine shop called Enos in the quarter of La Foce. During high school, Tenco founded the Jelly Roll Morton Boys Jazz band, in which Tenco played the clarinet and another singer, later to become famous, Bruno Lauzi, the banjo. Gino Paoli, who would become one of Italy's most famous singers and songwriters as well, also played with Tenco in the band he was later involved in, I Diavoli del Rock (The Rock Devils).

Tenco made his debut in the world of Italian professional music with the band I Cavalieri (The Knights), which included Giampiero Reverberi and Enzo Jannacci amongst others. During this period he used the pseudonym Gigi Mai. In 1961 Tenco released his first single under his real name, entitled Quando ("When").

He started university studying electronic engineering, trying to comply with the wish of his mother and brother. He twice failed the Analytic and Projective Geometry exam (a course he took with professor Eugenio Giuseppe Togliatti, the elder brother of the leader of the communist party Palmiro Togliatti). Later he was enrolled in political science, where he only gave two exams.

Tenco was interested in cinema and videomaking. In 1962 he began a short-lived cinematic experience, with Luciano Salce's movie La Cuccagna. He also collaborated on the soundtrack of the film, and introduced his friend Fabrizio De André (unknown at the time) through the song La ballata dell'eroe (Ballad for a hero). Director Luigi Comencini considered Tenco for the role of Bube in his film La ragazza di Bube, based on Carlo Cassola's novel. He ultimately chose George Chakiris, the West Side Story star, instead. During this period Tenco formed a strong friendship with the Genoese anarchist poet Riccardo Mannerini. In 1963, however, his friendship with Gino Paoli broke up, due to a troubled relationship with the actress Stefania Sandrelli.

Tenco's first LP, Ballate e Canzoni, was released in 1962. One of the songs, "Cara Maestra" ("Dear Teacher"), was censored by the then-thriving Italian media censorship. The censors struck again in the following year, against his songs "Io sì" ("I Would"), considered too sexually explicit, and "Una brava ragazza" ("A Good Girl"), where Tenco express his admiration for a '60s "bad girl". In September 1964, he released "Ho capito che ti amo", a song written by him with musical arrangement by Ezio Leoni. It was released on the Italian record label Jolly as Side A of a 45 rpm, side B being "Io lo so già". In Argentina, "Ho capito che ti amo" was the soundtrack of the popular soap opera El amor tiene cara de mujer.

In 1966, enduring a period of compulsory military service, he released "Un giorno dopo l'altro" (One Day after Another) for RCA. The military service did not stop him from traveling to Argentina together with Gianfranco Reverberi to meet the fans of El amor tiene cara de mujer.  How he managed to arrive in Argentina while his passport was still in possession of the Italian Army is unknown. Moreover, under the military service one was not allowed to leave Italy and the punishment was detention, which he did not experience according to his service record book.

In Rome during the same year, he met and befriended the Italian-French singer Dalida. The two were soon to become lovers.

1967 Sanremo Festival and death
In 1967, Tenco took part in the Italian Song Festival in Sanremo. It was rumoured that he participated against his will. He performed the song "Ciao amore, ciao" ("Bye, Bye my Love") with Dalida. The video of the performance is lost; however, the audio track, recorded from radio, survives.

In the early morning hours of 27 January 1967, Tenco was found dead in his room at the Hotel Savoy by his singing partner Dalida. Tenco died from a single gunshot wound to the head. His death was ultimately ruled a suicide.
Tenco was apparently upset after learning that his song had been eliminated from the final competition. His suicide note read: "I cared for the Italian public and I dedicated in vain five years of my life to them. I'm doing this not because I'm tired of life (I'm not) but as a gesture of dissent against the public who chose Io tu e le rose for the final night and against the commission that selected La rivoluzione. I hope this will clear somebody's head."

Tenco was buried in Ricaldone. In 1974, the Tenco Award was instituted, and has been held every year since in Sanremo. Many of the most renowned Italian singer-songwriters from the 1970s explicitly declared the influence of Tenco on their work. Francesco De Gregori's album Bufalo Bill of 1976 contained a song, "Festival", about Tenco's suicide; it points out the hypocrisy with which the music establishment tried to minimize the dramatic event, to let the show go on.

The inquiry 
In 2004, on TV program Domenica in, the detective who followed the inquiry, commissario Arrigo Molinari, when asked by host Paolo Bonolis, stated that he was sure that Tenco did not commit suicide and he defined his death: "a collective murder". He also justified his own faults concerning the Tenco inquiry by declaring that he had been prevented from investigating properly. Shortly after the quoted interview, Molinari died, killed by a thief.

In 2005, the French television channel TV5 carried a full-length dramatisation of the love affair of Tenco and Dalida. Tenco was played by Alessandro Gassman, while Dalida was played by Sabrina Ferilli. Notwithstanding the account of Tenco and Dalida's love story on which the dramatisation is based, at the beginning of the '90s Tenco's older brother Valentino met a woman, Valeria, who had in her possession several letters written by Tenco himself that would testify their love relationship started in 1964 and lasted until his death. In one of these letters, Tenco writes that his relationship with Dalida was nothing but a clumsy attempt to forget Valeria, who, months before, had left him. He describes Dalida as a woman: "spoiled, neurotic, ignorant, who rejects the idea of being defeated in her profession as in private life". Valentino Tenco identified those letters as written by his brother.

The Italian judicial system later began re-examining Luigi Tenco's suicide. It was pointed out that the bullet hole was on the left temple, while the singer was right-handed. It had also been revealed that no autopsy had been done on the singer's corpse, no paraffine test, and no calligraphic analysis on the suicide note with which he explained his final gesture.

On 15 February 2006, Italian police exhumed Tenco's body for further investigation. The next day, results from the new autopsy and ballistics analysis were reported. According to Italian experts, what had been thought to be the entry hole on the left temple was actually the exit site. The bullet trajectory
was said to be compatible with suicide.

Nevertheless, criminologists Pasquale Ragone and Nicola Guarneri, in their book Le ombre del silenzio (The shadows of silence, 2013) pointed out several incongruences between the shell casing of the bullet found in Tenco's room and the bullet Tenco's Walther PPK gun would eject. Professor of ballistic forensics Martino Farneti proved that they did not match. There was no proof nor official statement declaring that Tenco's Walther PPK was actually present in his room the night he died (the police registers show that the gun was actually found in his car), so Guarneri and Ragone think that Tenco might have been killed. The actual weapon might have been a Beretta 70, as it is possible to put a silencer on this type of gun (similar to a Walther PPK). In fact, the night Tenco died (allegedly in his hotel room), no one heard the sound of the gunshot, not even singer Lucio Dalla, whose room was next to Tenco's, nor did journalist Sandro Ciotti, whose room was in front of Tenco's.

Music producer and friend Paolo Dossena stated that he drove Tenco's car from Rome (where the songwriter lived) to Sanremo and on the way, passing through a roadblock on the Aurelia, he discovered that Tenco had his Walther PPK in the dashboard of his car. He later confronted the songwriter who confessed that he took a gun because someone in the past few weeks had tried to drop him down a steep road near Santa Margherita Ligure while he was driving.

The first witnesses who entered the room did not even see the suicide note. It was journalist Piero Vivarelli who delivered the note to the police after having spent a few minutes in Dalida's room. Guarneri and Ragone assume that the alleged suicide note might in fact have been the last page of a document written by Tenco for a different aim.

French journalist and novelist Philippe Brunel wrote a fiction book, La nuit de San Remo, in which he dramatises the arduous search for truth about Tenco's death.

Tributes
Shortly after Tenco's death, his friend and songwriter Fabrizio De André wrote for him the song Preghiera in gennaio (A prayer in January), where he describes a benevolent God welcoming those who committed suicide into Heaven, in spite of the moral condemnation of the bigots.

In 1999, the play Solitudini – Luigi Tenco e Dalida, written and directed by Maurizio Valtieri, was performed in Rome.

Discography

Albums
1962: Luigi Tenco
1965: Luigi Tenco
1966: Tenco

Compilations / Unreleased materials
1972: Luigi Tenco 
1972: Luigi Tenco canta Tenco, De André, Jannacci, Bob Dylan
1977: Agli amici cantautori
1984: Luigi Tenco

Extended plays
1967: Ti ricorderai di me...
1967: Se stasera sono qui
1969: Pensaci un po'

Singles
1959: "Mai"/"Giurami tu" 
1959: "Mi chiedi solo amore"/"Senza parole"
1959: "Amore"/"Non so ancora" (as Gigi Mai)
1959: "Vorrei sapere perché"/"Ieri" (as Gigi Mai)
1960: "Tell Me That You Love Me"/"Love Is Here to Stay" (as Gordon Cliff)
1960: "Quando"/"Sempre la stessa storia" (as Dick Ventuno)
1961: "Il mio regno"/"I miei giorni perduti"
1961: "Quando"/"Triste sera"
1961: "Una vita inutile"/"Ti ricorderai"	
1961: "Ti ricorderai"/"Quando"	
1961: "Ti ricorderai"/"Se qualcuno ti dirà"
1961: "Quando"/"Se qualcuno ti dirà"/"Ti ricorderai"/"I miei giorni perduti"
1961: "Senza parole"/"In qualche parte del mondo"
1962: "Come le altre"/"La mia geisha"	
1962: "In qualche parte del mondo"
1962: "Quello che conta"/"Tra tanta gente"/"La ballata dell'eroe"	
1962: "Angela"/"Mi sono innamorato di te" 
1962: "Quando"/"Il mio regno"
1963: "Io sì"/"Una brava ragazza"
1964: "Ragazzo mio"/"No, non è vero"
1964: "Ho capito che ti amo"/"Io lo so già"
1965: "Tu non hai capito niente"/"Non sono io"
1966: "Se sapessi come fai"/"Un giorno dopo l'altro"
1966: "Lontano lontano"/"Ognuno è libero"	
1967: "Ciao amore, ciao"/"E se ci diranno"
1967: "Quando"/"Mi sono innamorato di te"
1967: "Ti ricorderai"/"Angela"	
1967: "Guarda se io"/"Vedrai vedrai"
1967: "Io vorrei essere là"/"Io sono uno"
1967: "Se stasera sono qui"/"Cara maestra"
1968: "Pensaci un po'"/"Il tempo dei limoni"	
1970: "Vedrai vedrai"/"Ah... l'amore l'amore"
1984: "Serenella"

See also
 Dalida
 Christian de la Mazière

References

External links

 Luigi Tenco 60's – La verde isola fatta di soli amici
 
 Luigi Tenco article on Cult Cargo

1938 births
1967 suicides
People from Cassine, Piedmont
Italian male singer-songwriters
Suicides by firearm in Italy
Dalida
20th-century Italian male actors
20th-century Italian male singers
Italian jazz musicians
Italian jazz clarinetists
Italian jazz saxophonists
Philips Records artists
1967 deaths